Clackmannan Road railway station served the town of Clackmannan, Clackmannanshire, Scotland from 1850 to 1921 on the Stirling and Dunfermline Railway.

History 
The station opened as Clackmannan on 28 August 1850 by the North British Railway. The goods yard was to the northeast. The station closed on 1 January 1917 but reopened on 1 April 1919, only to close again on 1 December 1921.

References

External links 
RailScot

Disused railway stations in Clackmannanshire
Railway stations in Great Britain opened in 1850
Railway stations in Great Britain closed in 1917
Railway stations in Great Britain opened in 1919
Railway stations in Great Britain closed in 1921
Former North British Railway stations
1850 establishments in Scotland
1921 disestablishments in Scotland